Sang-e Atash (also Romanized as Sang-e Ātash and Sang Ātash) is a village in Tabadkan Rural District, in the Central District of Mashhad County, Razavi Khorasan Province, Iran. At the 2006 census, its population was 29, in 7 families.

References 

Populated places in Mashhad County